Seán Buckley (died 1963) was an Irish politician. He was elected to Dáil Éireann as a Sinn Féin Teachta Dála (TD) for the Cork West constituency at the 1923 general election. He lost his seat at the June 1927 general election. 

He next stood for election at the 1938 general election and was elected as a Fianna Fáil TD. He was re-elected at each general election until he retired from politics at the 1954 general election.

References

Year of birth missing
1963 deaths
Early Sinn Féin TDs
Fianna Fáil TDs
Members of the 4th Dáil
Members of the 10th Dáil
Members of the 11th Dáil
Members of the 12th Dáil
Members of the 13th Dáil
Members of the 14th Dáil
Politicians from County Cork